= Sand Point Beach =

Coordinates: 50°41′38″N 105°34′45″W

Sand Point Beach is an unincorporated community in the Canadian province of Saskatchewan. Listed as a designated place by Statistics Canada, the community had a population of 64 in the Canada 2006 Census.
